Guri (also Romanized as Gūrī) is a village in Miyan Jovin Rural District, Helali District, Joghatai County, Razavi Khorasan Province, Iran. At the 2006 census, its population was 977, in 259 families.

References 

Populated places in Joghatai County